Dong Ziqi (born April 3, 1999, in Harbin, Heilongjiang) is a Chinese female curler. She currently plays second on the Chinese National Women's Curling Team, skipped by Han Yu.

Career
Dong played third for the Chinese team that won a bronze medal at the 2018 World Junior Curling Championships. She was also the third for the team that won a bronze at the 2018 Pacific-Asia Curling Championships. Dong also competed in three legs of the 2018–19 Curling World Cup with her best finish at the Third Leg, where her team finished fourth. Dong played third for the Chinese team at the 2021 World Women's Curling Championship, skipped by Han Yu. The team finished in tenth at the tournament with a 6–7 record.

Personal life
Dong attended Beijing Sport University.

Teams

References

External links

 Dong Ziqi - Curling World Cup profile 
 Video: 

Living people
1999 births
Sportspeople from Harbin
Chinese female curlers

Place of birth missing (living people)
Curlers at the 2022 Winter Olympics
Olympic curlers of China
Competitors at the 2023 Winter World University Games
Medalists at the 2023 Winter World University Games
21st-century Chinese women